Ray Stephen (born 9 December 1962) is a Scottish former professional footballer who played as a striker.

Career
Born in Aberdeen, Stephen played in Scotland and France for Dundee, Nancy, Kilmarnock and Cove Rangers. He was signed for AS Nancy by Arsène Wenger.

References

1962 births
Living people
Scottish footballers
Dundee F.C. players
Kilmarnock F.C. players
Cove Rangers F.C. players
Scottish Football League players
Scotland B international footballers
Scotland under-21 international footballers
AS Nancy Lorraine players
Scottish expatriate footballers
Expatriate footballers in France
Footballers from Aberdeen
Association football forwards